The Indian cricket team toured England from 5 May to 13 July 1982 for two One Day Internationals (ODIs) as part of the Prudential Trophy, and a three-match Test series.

England beat India in both the ODIs. Allan Lamb, who made his ODI debut for England in the series, and scored 134 runs, was named the player of the series along with India's Kapil Dev, who scored 102 runs in the two games. In the Test series that followed, England beat India 1–0. Dev was named the player of the series, having scored 292 runs at an average of 73 and a wicket tally of 10. Also as a part of the tour, India played ten other first-class games, winning one and drawing nine, and three limited overs games, winning and losing one each.

Tour matches

Limited overs match: Lavinia, Duchess of Norfolk's XI vs Indians

Three-day match: Warwickshire v Indians

Three-day match: Nottinghamshire vs Indians

Three-day match: Yorkshire vs Indians

Three-day match: Marylebone Cricket Club vs Indians

Three-day match: Kent vs Indians

Limited overs match: Ireland vs Indians

Limited overs match: Ireland vs Indians

Three-day match: Hampshire vs Indians

Three-day match: Northamptonshire vs Indians

Two-day match: Oxford and Cambridge Universities vs Indians

Three-day match: Gloucestershire vs Indians

Three-day match: Essex vs Indians

Prudential Trophy
The 1982 edition of the Prudential Trophy was a One Day International (ODI) cricket tournament held in England. In the two ODIs between England and India, the former won both the games.

First match

Second match

Test series summary

First Test

Second Test

Third Test

References

External sources
CricketArchive – tour itineraries

Annual reviews
 Playfair Cricket Annual 1983
 Wisden Cricketers' Almanack 1983

Further reading
 Ramachandra Guha, A Corner of a Foreign Field - An Indian History of a British Sport, Picador, 2001

1982 in Indian cricket
1982 in English cricket
1982
International cricket competitions from 1980–81 to 1985